Ka Loko Reservoir is a reservoir created by an earthen dam on the island of Kauai, Hawaii. Waters flow from Ka Loko Reservoir down to Waiakalua Reservoir, Waiakalua Stream and down to the Pacific Ocean.

Ka Loko (sometimes spelled Kaloko) is notable because its dam burst on March 14, 2006. The dam burst was preceded by unusually heavy rain. The flood destroyed several homes, killed 7 people, including a toddler and a pregnant woman.

An independent civil investigation attributed several possible conditions and practices that may have led to the dam failure: The State of Hawaii did not adequately inspect the dam and did not have enough dam inspectors to cover all of the antiquated dams in the state. The owner of the dam (James Pflueger) performed grading operations near the dam without permits and may have filled in the emergency spillway for the dam. Neither the current nor prior owners of the dam maintained the dam adequately. Finally, the County of Kauai knew about the unpermitted grading operation, but did not enforce a stop-work order.

On November 21, 2008, James Pflueger was indicted for manslaughter and reckless endangerment in relation to the dam failure. Pflueger's lawyer claimed that the indictment was an attempt by the state of Hawaii to deflect its own responsibility in the matter.

On August 4, 2009, it was reported that a settlement between the parties of all civil cases has been agreed upon, pending judicial review. On July 17, 2013, Pflueger entered a plea of no contest to reckless endangering in a deal with prosecutors. In exchange for the plea, state prosecutors agreed to drop seven manslaughter counts. 

In December of 2021 the Honolulu Star Advertiser announced 110 acres surrounding Ka Loko reservoir had been purchased by Mark and Priscilla Chan Zuckerberg. Mark Zuckerberg stated his attention to fulfill the legal requirements for the property.

External links and references

 
 
 
 

Reservoirs in Hawaii
Lakes of Hawaii
Dams in Hawaii
Floods in the United States
2006 disasters in the United States
Bodies of water of Kauai
Dam failures in the United States
Disasters in Hawaii
Buildings and structures in Kauai County, Hawaii
2006 in Hawaii
Trials in the United States